The Iowa Cubs are a Minor League Baseball team of the International League and the Triple-A affiliate of the Chicago Cubs. They are located in Des Moines, Iowa, and are named for their Major League Baseball (MLB) affiliate. The Cubs play their home games at Principal Park, which opened in 1992. They previously played at Sec Taylor Stadium from 1969 to 1991.

The club was established as the Iowa Oaks of the Triple-A American Association in 1969. Iowa took on the Cubs moniker in 1982. They joined the Triple-A Pacific Coast League in 1998 following the dissolution of the American Association after the 1997 season. In conjunction with MLB's reorganization of Minor League Baseball in 2021, the Cubs were shifted to the Triple-A East, which was renamed the International League in 2022.

The only league title in franchise history is the 1993 American Association championship.

History

American Association (1969–1997)

Triple-A Minor League Baseball came to Iowa's capital city in 1969, as the Iowa Oaks of the American Association (AA) began play as an affiliate of the Oakland Athletics. They played their home games at Sec Taylor Stadium, which opened in 1947 and was located at the confluence of the Des Moines and Raccoon Rivers. Many future Major League Baseball stars such as sluggers Bill McNulty, Hall of Famer Harold Baines, Pat Tabler, and 1971 Cy Young and MVP Award winning left-handed pitcher Vida Blue spent time with the Oaks. Both Bucky Dent and future Hall-of-Famer Goose Gossage played for the Oaks early in their careers. The A's farm club experienced winning seasons in 1970 and 1971, but third and second-place finishes kept them out of the playoffs.

The Oaks became the top affiliate of the Chicago White Sox in 1973. They won the East Division that season with an 83–53 record, earning a spot in the best-of-seven American Association championship playoffs, but they were defeated by the Tulsa Oilers, 4–3. Manager Joe Sparks won the American Association Manager of the Year Award. Oaks pitchers tossed two no-hitters in 1974, both in away games. The first was pitched by Joe Henderson against the Wichita Aeros on July 31. The second occurred on August 25 when Butch Stinson no-hit the Indianapolis Indians.

After one season as the Houston Astros' Triple-A club in 1975, Iowa returned to the White Sox organization in 1976. Despite a number of winning seasons, they failed to qualify for the postseason during the five years of their second affiliation with Chicago. On September 1, 1977, Chris Knapp and Fred Howard combined to no-hit the Omaha Royals. On May 26, 1978, Jack Kucek tossed a no-hitter at Sec Taylor Stadium against the Oklahoma City 89ers. The franchise was awarded the 1978 John H. Johnson President's Award, recognizing them as the "complete baseball franchise—based on franchise stability, contributions to league stability, contributions to baseball in the community, and promotion of the baseball industry." Former St. Louis Cardinals manager Tony La Russa managed the Iowa Oaks in 1979 prior to becoming manager of the White Sox. Pitcher Dewey Robinson was selected for the 1979 American Association Most Valuable Pitcher Award after achieving a record of 13–7 and 9 saves with a 2.93 earned run average (ERA) and 76 strikeouts.

In 1981, the team affiliated with the Chicago Cubs. After a final season as the Oaks, they adopted the nickname of their parent team in 1982 becoming the Iowa Cubs. The name is often shortened to "I-Cubs" to avoid confusion with the major league team. Iowa teams of the 1980s often finished high in the standings but were unable to qualify for the championship playoffs. The only exceptions being in 1983 and 1984 when they earned spots in the semi-finals but were eliminated by Denver both years.

Members of the 1982 team garnered several league awards. Jay Howell, who struck out 139 batters on the way to a 13–4 record and a 2.36 ERA, won the AA Most Valuable Pitcher Award. Skipper Jim Napier was the league's Manager of the Year. Outfielder Mel Hall was the Rookie of the Year after accruing a batting average of .329 while hitting 34 doubles and 32 home runs and driving in 125 runs. Another Cub outfielder, Joe Carter won the 1983 Rookie of the Year Award after stealing 40 bases and hitting .307 with 22  homers. In 1984, Reggie Patterson fired a no-hitter against the Omaha Royals on August 21. The club was given the 1986 Larry MacPhail Award in rocognition of their marketing and promotion efforts.

Sec Taylor Stadium was demolished after the 1991 season, and a new facility of the same name, later renamed Principal Park, was constructed on the site in time for the Cubs' 1992 season.

Following a dismal 1992 campaign in which the Cubs went 51–92, they rebounded to win the 1993 Western Division title at 85–59 under manager Marv Foley. They met the Nashville Sounds in the best-of-seven championship series. Leading the series 3–1, the Cubs lost two consecutive games and were forced to a game seven. In the final game, Nashville held a 2–1 lead from the third inning to the seventh before the Cubs tied the game necessitating extra innings. An eleventh-inning walk-off home run by Iowa's Tuffy Rhodes ended the game and gave the Cubs their first league title. Outfielder Eduardo Zambrano garnered the American Association Most Valuable Player Award after collecting 115 RBI and hitting 32 home runs with a .303 average. Iowa did not reach the playoffs again until 1997. They captured the Western Division title with a 74–69 record before defeating the New Orleans Zephyrs in the semi-finals. They were swept by the Buffalo Bisons, 3–0, in the championship round.

Pacific Coast League (1998–2020)

The American Association, of which the Cubs had been members since their inaugural 1969 campaign, disbanded after the 1997 season. Its teams were absorbed by the two remaining Triple-A leagues—the International League and Pacific Coast League (PCL). The Cubs joined the PCL and won the American Conference Central Division title in 1998 with an 85–59 record. In the American Conference series, they were bested by the New Orleans Zephyrs, 2–1, in a rain-shortened series. Manager Terry Kennedy won the PCL Manager of the Year Award. Former Chicago Cubs manager and Iowa native Bruce Kimm managed the I-Cubs from 2001 to 2002. He led them to the 2001 division title (83–60), but they were again eliminated by New Orleans in the conference series. The Cubs won their second John H. Johnson President's Award in 2002.

Mike Quade, former manager of the Chicago Cubs, managed Iowa from 2003 to 2006. The Cubs ended the 2004 season at 79–64 giving them another division title. This time, they defeated the Oklahoma RedHawks, 3–2, to win the American Conference championship. In the best-of-five Pacific Coast League championship series, they lost to the Sacramento River Cats, 3–0. In 2007, catcher Geovany Soto, with a .353 average, 26 home runs, and 109 RBI, won the PCL Most Valuable Player Award. Led by PCL Manager of the Year Pat Listach, the 2008 Cubs won the American Conference Northern Division (83–59), but were beaten in the conference series by Oklahoma, 3–2.

In 2010, the team was managed by Baseball Hall of Fame inductee Ryne Sandberg who was also selected as the league's Manager of the Year. First baseman Bryan LaHair won the 2010 PCL MVP Award with his .331 average, 38 homers, and 109 RBI. On May 7, 2014, Iowa starter Chris Rusin pitched a no-hitter against the New Orleans Zephyrs. In 2015, right-hander Carlos Pimentel won the PCL Pitcher of the Year Award after achieving a 12–6 record with 118 strikeouts and a 2.95 ERA. The Cubs returned to the postseason in 2019 having won the division 75–65, but they were eliminated by the Round Rock Express in the American Conference series. Colin Rea, who paced the league with 14 wins, was recognized as the PCL Pitcher of the Year.

The start of the 2020 season was postponed due to the COVID-19 pandemic before being cancelled on June 30.

Triple-A East / International League (2021–present)

Following the 2020 season, Major League Baseball assumed control of Minor League Baseball in a move to increase player salaries, modernize facility standards, and reduce travel. The Chicago Cubs retained Iowa as their Triple-A affiliate, but the Pacific Coast League disbanded, and the Cubs were placed in the Triple-A East. Iowa began competition in the new league on May 4 with a 3–0 loss to the Indianapolis Indians at Principal Park. On May 9, the Cubs tossed the league's first no-hitter when Shelby Miller, Tommy Nance, Brad Wieck, and Ryan Meisinger combined to no-hit Indianapolis, 2–0, in Des Moines. Pitchers Justin Steele, Scott Effross, and Dillon Maples threw the league's second no-hitter in the first game of a seven-inning doubleheader against the St. Paul Saints on July 11, a 1–0 home win. Iowa ended the season in seventh place in the Midwestern Division with a 50–70 record. No playoffs were held to determine a league champion; instead, the team with the best regular-season record was declared the winner. However, 10 games that had been postponed from the start of the season were reinserted into the schedule as a postseason tournament called the Triple-A Final Stretch in which all 30 Triple-A clubs competed for the highest winning percentage. Iowa finished the tournament in 29th place with a 1–8 record. In December 2021, owner Michael Gartner announced that the team was sold to Endeavor. In 2022, the Triple-A East became known as the International League, the name historically used by the regional circuit prior to the 2021 reorganization.

Season-by-season records

Roster

Awards

The franchise has been awarded these honors by Minor League Baseball.

Nine players, five managers, and one executive have won league awards in recognition for their performance with Iowa.

References

External links

 Official website
 Statistics from Baseball-Reference

 
1969 establishments in Iowa
American Association (1902–1997) teams
Baseball teams established in 1969
Chicago Cubs minor league affiliates
Chicago White Sox minor league affiliates
Defunct Pacific Coast League teams
International League teams
Houston Astros minor league affiliates
Oakland Athletics minor league affiliates
Professional baseball teams in Iowa
Sports in Des Moines, Iowa
Triple-A East teams